South Bar is a small community near Sydney, Nova Scotia.  It derives its name from the nearby Southeast Bar which extends over  out into Sydney Harbour, sheltering the community and its small fishing harbour from the open waters of Spanish Bay.  The community's harbour is managed by the South Bar Fishermen's Harbour Authority.  The local Fire Department, the South Bar Volunteer Fire Department, was established in 1982.

References
Destination Nova Scotia
South Bar Harbour - Fisheries and Oceans Canada
Photo - Fisheries and Oceans Canada

General Service Areas in Nova Scotia
Communities in the Cape Breton Regional Municipality